Amy Lysle Smart (born March 26, 1976) is an American actress. A native of Los Angeles, Smart began her career modelling in Italy and subsequently enrolled in acting school.

Her first role in film was in director Martin Kunert's anthology horror film Campfire Tales, followed by a minor part in Paul Verhoeven's Starship Troopers (1997). In 1998, Smart played a role in Dee Snider's Strangeland.  She garnered widespread recognition after appearing in the mainstream teen drama Varsity Blues (1999), as well as for her recurring role as Ruby on the television series Felicity (1999–2001). She followed this with a lead role in the college sex comedy Road Trip (2000), and co-starred in Jerry Zucker's ensemble comedy Rat Race (2001). She had a lead role opposite Ashton Kutcher in the sci-fi drama The Butterfly Effect (2004).

Smart co-starred with Ryan Reynolds and Anna Faris in Just Friends (2005), followed by the sports drama Peaceful Warrior (2006). From 2011 to 2012, she had a recurring role as Jasmine Hollander on the series Shameless. She subsequently starred in Tyler Perry's comedy The Single Moms Club (2014). Since 2020, Smart has starred as Barbara Whitmore in the DC Universe/The CW superhero drama series Stargirl.

Life and career

1976–1992: Early life
Smart was born in Los Angeles, California, and raised in Topanga Canyon. Her mother, Judy Lysle (née Carrington), worked at a museum, and her father, John Boden Smart, was a salesman. She studied ballet for ten years, and graduated from Palisades Charter High School.

1993–2003: Modeling and film beginnings
While modeling in Milan, Italy, Smart met fellow model Ali Larter and the two "became instant friends", according to Larter. In Los Angeles, they took acting classes together.

After appearing in the video for The Lemonheads' "It's About Time" in 1993, Smart's first film role was in director Martin Kunert's Campfire Tales, followed by a small role as Queenie in the 1996 adaptation of John Updike's short story "A&P". She had a minor role in Paul Verhoeven's science fiction thriller Starship Troopers (1997) as a copilot, and a starring role in the miniseries The 70s, playing a young woman from Ohio. In 1999, Smart played the girlfriend of a popular American football player in the film Varsity Blues, reuniting her with Larter. Also in 1999, she appeared in the film Outside Providence.

From 1999 to 2001 Smart played Ruby, a recurring character on the series Felicity. She costarred in the films Road Trip (2000), Rat Race (2001), Starsky & Hutch (2004), and the science fiction drama The Butterfly Effect (2004).

In 2003, Smart had a small role in the American sitcom Scrubs, playing Jamie Moyer.

2005–2013: Studio films and television

In 2005, Smart co-starred with Ryan Reynolds in the romantic comedy film Just Friends, playing the high school friend of a previously overweight young man who, years later, returns to her hometown and attempts to confess his love for her. The film was a box office hit, grossing over $50 million worldwide. Also in 2005, she starred as Sarah in the British independent film The Best Man with Seth Green. She had a lead role in the independent drama Bigger Than the Sky (2005), a loose adaptation of Cyrano de Bergerac.

Smart appeared in the 2006 action thriller film Crank. She reprised the role in the sequel, Crank: High Voltage, released in 2009.

Smart was a regular cast member in the short-lived 2006 CBS television series Smith, playing a professional burglar. She has also voiced characters in the animated series Robot Chicken, created by Seth Green. Smart appeared as Joy in the 2006 sports drama Peaceful Warrior, about a gymnast whose life changes after an encounter with a spiritual guide. She starred as Melissa in the 2008 independent horror film Seventh Moon, and had a supporting role in Alexandre Aja's supernatural thriller Mirrors (2008).

In March 2011, Smart joined the Showtime comedy-drama Shameless as recurring character Jasmine Hollander. She continued to guest star in season two. On September 20, 2011, Smart married TV carpenter Carter Oosterhouse from the U.S. cable channel HGTV, in Traverse City, Michigan.

2014–present: Television and independent films
In 2014, Smart appeared in the Tyler Perry comedy The Single Moms Club, followed by the thriller Hangman (2015). In 2016, she appeared in a supporting role in the television film Sister Cities (2016). She also appeared in two episodes of the IFC series Maron (2016), portraying Nina.

On December 26, 2016, Smart's daughter, Flora, was born via a surrogate; she revealed this publicly in 2017, explaining that she struggled for years trying to conceive, writing: "After years of fertility struggles I give thanks today to our kind, loving surrogate for carrying her."

In 2019, Smart was cast to play Barbara Whitmore in the DC Universe/The CW superhero drama television series Stargirl, a role she has played since 2020.

Personal life
Smart married television personality Carter Oosterhouse on September 10, 2011, in Traverse City, Michigan. They had their first child, Flora Oosterhouse, via surrogate.

Filmography

Film

Television

Awards and nominations

In popular culture 
Amy Smart is the subject of the Last Letters song "I Love You, Amy Smart".

References

External links

 

20th-century American actresses
21st-century American actresses
Actresses from Los Angeles
American environmentalists
American women environmentalists
American expatriates in Italy
American female models
American film actresses
American television actresses
Living people
People from Topanga, California
1976 births